High Tide is the second album by High Tide. The album is slightly less heavy, with folk-influences within the band's sound. Though guitarist Tony Hill would later record with a new band under the High Tide banner, as well as releasing posthumous compilations of demos, this was the last proper album by the original group.

Reception

The Allmusic review by Wilson Neate awarded the album 3 stars stating "The interplay of guitarist Tony Hill and violinist Simon House is still very much at the core of High Tide's distinctive hybrid of psychedelia, prog, and hard rock, but while Hill lays down his characteristically intricate, searing guitar lines, he forgoes the sort of weighty, molten riffage that made Sea Shanties such a behemoth. Without that overall sonic density, this album fails to engage listeners as readily as its predecessor... alongside Sea Shanties, this unimaginatively titled, three-track, 32-minute album finds High Tide at a disappointing low ebb, as if ideas and energy were already drying up."

Track listing
All tracks by High Tide except where noted.

2006 Remaster Bonus Tracks

Personnel 
High Tide
Roger Hadden - drums, piano, pipe organ
Tony Hill - guitar, vocals, acoustic guitar, organ
Simon House - electric violin, organ, piano
Peter Pavli - bass guitar

References 

1970 albums
High Tide (band) albums
Liberty Records albums
albums recorded at Morgan Sound Studios